Camping coaches were holiday accommodation offered by many railway companies in the United Kingdom and the Republic of Ireland from the 1930s. The coaches were old passenger vehicles no longer suitable for use in trains, which were converted to provide sleeping and living space at static locations.

The charges for the use of these coaches were designed to encourage groups of people to travel by train to the stations where they were situated; they were also encouraged to make use of the railway to travel around the area during their holiday.

History
Camping coaches were first introduced by the London and North Eastern Railway in 1933, when they positioned ten coaches in picturesque places around their network.

The following year, two other railway companies followed suit: the London, Midland and Scottish Railway, with what it originally called "caravans", and the Great Western Railway which called them "camp coaches". In 1935 they were introduced on the Southern Railway.

At the outset of the 1935 season there were 215 coaches at 162 sites through Great Britain. They proved popular and their numbers were steadily increased so that 1939 there were 439 coaches in use, more than half of which were situated on the London, Midland and Scottish Railway.

During World War II the coaches were generally unavailable to the public after 1940 as they were used by various authorities as emergency accommodation. By the end of the war most of the coaches needed refurbishment before they could be put back into public use, only the Southern Railway made this effort.

After the railways were nationalised a second generation of camping coaches were introduced from 1952 by British Railways, these vehicles were generally more up-to-date, spacious and better equipped. In the early 1960s the stock was enhanced by the conversion of some redundant Pullman coaches, the service peaked at 223 vehicles in 1962.

The Beeching cuts brought an end to the service with a lot of smaller lines, where the coaches were often located, closing and coaches being scrapped. The last coaches available for public use were withdrawn at the end of the 1971 season.

Some camping coaches were conversions of vehicles that were no longer fit for operation and these remained static, in some instances "grounded" with running gear removed or on sections of track that were not connected to an operational line. Others retained the ability to be relocated to address operational requirements, which was possible because of the simplicity of the camping-style accommodation and because the running gear could be adequately maintained. Rail vehicles used for accommodation purposes today are generally not maintained in this way and are no longer compliant with current rail technical and safety standards. They may be adapted to a stationary configuration with e.g. mains water, electricity and sewage connections to meet modern comfort expectations and such modification renders them unfit for movement by rail.

London and North Eastern Railway
The London and North Eastern Railway (LNER) first introduced camping coaches in 1933 and they converted 119 vehicles between then and 1938.

Construction and layout
The vehicles selected for conversion were varied but there were several common characteristics. They were mostly five-compartment, six-wheel coaches of 1880s and 1890s vintage. Most of the fittings were stripped out of three of the compartments including the partitions between them to make a living room and kitchen area. The remaining two compartments remained for use as bedrooms, these had the seat backs removed, providing four berths, and were fitted with two upper berths in one of the compartments, providing an additional two berths for a total of six berths.

The first batch of 35 conversions for use in 1933 and 1934 lacked any means of interior access from the living room to the bedrooms, subsequent conversions were provided with an inside corridor and the early vehicles retrospectively modified in 1936. Space was found for the corridor by constructing the ends of the beds with a hinge, which could be turned back to permit passage through the doorway. Four other conversions were made, all to bogie equipped stock, 3 were converted into 8 berth camping coaches for use along the Norfolk coast and one became the Touring Camping Coach.

There were no mains services provided and campers were expected to use the station facilities for toilets and water. Paraffin was initially used for both cooking and lighting. Campers were expected to be self-sufficient during their stay.

The coaches proved immediately popular, 1,773 enquiries within a month and all ten coaches continuously occupied through July, August and September.

Locations
In both of the 1933 and 1934 seasons it was possible to book a camping coach and have it positioned at a station of your choice (within certain criteria) along a branch line, in some circumstances it was possible to have your coach moved during the course of your stay from one station to another. This practice was discontinued from 1935 when the advertised locations of the coaches were considered to be fixed for the season.

The remaining five coaches could be positioned at any of:
 on the Cornhill Branch of the former NER.

It was more complicated in 1934, a further 25 coaches were available bringing the total to 35. The LNER decided to allow its customers to decide where they wanted their coach to be positioned, from a range of 82 stations on 29 different branch lines throughout its operational areas in England and Scotland.

From 1935 the coaches were all advertised as being at fixed sites, there was usually only one coach per site, occasionally two and three at three sites,  and  East Row. In addition to the sites listed above the following stations had one or more camping coaches for at least one season between 1935 and 1939, a full listing with numbers is available at McRae (1997):

Some of the stations hosting camping coaches had been closed to passenger traffic before the coaches were located there and the railways made alternative arrangements to get campers to the coaches, sometimes this was by bus from a nearby staffed station, occasionally an unscheduled stop was made by a local train.

Touring camping coach
The LNER introduced a Touring Camping Coach in 1935, this service enabled campers to undertake a  week-long tour of the Yorkshire Dales from York.

The vehicle was a conversion of a bogie carriage from 1905 and had a living/dining room with kitchenette and six one-person sleeping compartments, a toilet and a seventh compartment could be used as a bathroom, store or an extra sleeping compartment utilising a collapsible camp bed. As with the static camping coaches campers were expected to provide their own provisions. The whole coach had to be booked for the week with a minimum of 6 campers, the cost was £2 per person out-of-season and £2.10s during July, August and September.

Out of season it was possible to hire the touring coach with different itineraries.

Camping apartments
The LNER converted some station buildings for use as Camping Apartments, they were similar in idea to the camping coaches and were a way of utilising the buildings at stations were passenger services had been withdrawn. Initially, in 1935, nine apartments
The apartments were mainly for six people but some were able to offer accommodation to smaller parties.

Coronation week 1937
Camping coaches were used during coronation week in 1937 when fifty two vehicles were moved to the London area to provide accommodation for parties wishing to witness the coronation. The rental conditions were very similar, six return tickets (on the LNER of course) from home to London, and an increased rental charge of £10 for the coach.

London, Midland and Scottish Railway
The London, Midland and Scottish Railway (LMS) introduced camping caravans in 1934 after they had seen the success of the LNER scheme. They converted 42 vehicles for use in 1934 and more each year reaching a total of 232 vehicles by the outbreak of World War II.

Construction and layout
The accommodation provided by the LMS was similar to that of the LNER, except that the LMS used redundant bogie coaches with corridors from the start. The LMS laid their conversions out a little differently in that they maintained three compartments as bedrooms each with two beds that were positioned along the length of the coach, they were able to do this and still provide a reasonable sized living/dining room because of the longer coaches they used.

Some smaller 6-wheeled coaches were converted to 4-berth caravans for use on the Northern Counties Committee system in Northern Ireland, an initial batch of 8 was converted for the 1935 season and 25 altogether before the war.

Locations
The LMS positioned its caravans in different ways, some were sited as individuals, quite a few as a pair or three together but they also established colonies of them with the coaches sited in large concentrations, this sometimes meant they needed to construct facilities for the campers as the vehicles had no toilets or other mains facilities.

Over the years 1935-1939 the following locations were used for at least one season, a full listing with numbers is available at McRae (1997):

Coronation week 1937
Caravans were relocated during coronation week in 1937 when around fifty vehicles were moved to the London area to provide accommodation for parties wishing to witness the coronation. In the usual LMS way they were sited in colonies, the final disposition of the coaches is uncertain but they were planned to be at  Goods Yard,  and possibly . The LMS had also proposed providing additional porters to assist the campers.

Great Western Railway

In a similar way to the LMS the Great Western Railway (GWR) introduced their camp coach holidays scheme in 1934 after they had seen the initial success of the LNER scheme. They converted 19 vehicles for use in 1934 and more each year reaching a total of 65 vehicles by the outbreak of World War II.

Construction and layout
17 of the 19 initial coach conversions were very similar to the LNER camping coaches, they were conversions of redundant  6-wheel carriage stock, the conversion resulted in two bedrooms, one with two berths and the other with four all running across the coach. There was no internal corridor, toilet or plumbing.

This camp coach had ten berths by the provision of an additional four-berth compartment.

Subsequent conversions were made to a variety of 4, 6 and 8 wheel vehicles including some that had been built as convertible for the broad or standard gauge, this variety meant that the GWR was able to offer camp coaches of different sizes. They allocated coaches to either type A, B, C or D:
Type A, 20 in total,  were 6 berth with the kitchen and dining/living room in the centre.
Type B, 18 in total,  were 6 berth with the kitchen and dining/living room at one end and the sleeping compartments at the other.
Type C, 26 in total,  were 8 berth with the kitchen and dining/living room in the centre, one 2 berth sleeping compartment at one end and a two and four berth compartment at the other.
Type D was the only 10 berth coach.

All the later, after 1934, conversions were made with internal corridors and the berths running along the length of the coach, the original conversions had a corridor retro-fitted by 1937.

Locations
The GWR instituted a one coach per site policy, trying to obtain an air of 'privacy and exclusivity'. Local staff were expected to go out of their way to assist campers, providing advice and assistance.

The camp coach locations in 1934 were:

The following sites were used between 1935 and 1939, full lists are available at McRae (1997) and Fenton (1999) (who also provides much more detail of each site):

Coronation week 1937
The coaches were let at twice the normal hire rate for the week.

Southern Railway
The Southern Railway (SR) introduced camping coaches from the summer of 1935, they had fewer vehicles available compared to the others of the Big Four companies with a total of 24 coaches in use by 1939.
The Southern Railway restored camping coach facilities at several holiday sites in Devon and Cornwall in 1947. They were able to use 21 of the original 24 coaches, and converted three more to replace the lost ones.

Construction and layout
The 24 Southern Camping Coaches were in two batches of 12:
The first batch were all converted from former London, Chatham and Dover Railway six-wheel stock of 1887-1897 vintage at the end of 1934. They were similar in style to the second batch of LNER coaches with two sleeping compartments and an internal corridor. They differed in that the sleeping compartments were designed so that one had two lower berths and the other had two lower berths with one upper berth, the sixth bed was located in the living area. Other differences were that the coaches were provided with running water, fed by a pump from a  tank fixed under the coach.
The second batch were converted from former London and South Western Railway bogie stock between 1936 and 1938. These coaches had similar fixtures and fittings as the first batch and despite being longer they were still designed for six people.

Locations
The SR charged £2 10s 0d during April to June and £3 10s 0d during July to September but it was also necessary for campers to purchase at least four monthly return tickets to the coaches and the SR deliberately selected sites that would provide additional income from these ticket fares.

In 1938 the SR instituted a policy of moving some of the coaches in the middle of the season, presumably to offer more choice to campers, this experiment was not repeated.

Wartime
The government took control of the railways during World War II exercising that control through the Railway Executive Committee (REC). The REC controlled the use of camping coaches throughout the war initially determining that they should be available for when circumstances required the provision of emergency quarters. In 1940, the first summer season after the war's start about half of the camping coaches were still available to the general public, around 200 vehicles were pressed into war service.

By the end of 1940 the REC determined that camping coaches would be retained for housing railway staff made homeless by enemy action or as lodgings for those transferred away from home. Despite this decision there were numerous demands for use of the coaches some of which were fulfilled, such as at Malmesbury land reclamation scheme in Wiltshire and the construction of the emergency port at Cairnryan Harbour.

British Railways
After the war the railways eventually reclaimed their camping coaches but they were mostly in very poor condition and either relegated to departmental duties or scrapped. Apart from on the Southern Railway camping coaches did not reappear across the network until after nationalisation when British Railways (BR) re-introduced them in the summer of 1952.

Each region of BR effectively managed its own scheme although there was some all-region publicity during the peak years of camping coach provision.

Pullman Holiday Coaches
During the early 1960s a fleet of Pullman coaches became available as the Kent coast lines were electrified under the Modernisation and Re-Equipment Plan published in December 1954. Between 1960 and 1964 a total of 57 coaches were converted and distributed around the regions.

The converted Pullman coaches were provided with 6 berths distributed in three bedrooms. The master bedroom at the end of the corridor ran the full width of the carriage and had two single beds either side of the room. The other two bedrooms were reached from the corridor but were the width of the corridor narrower, they were provided with bunk beds, some of the kitchen and living rooms ran full width but some had a side corridor restricting them.

The coaches were distributed as follows:

The locations and numbers of Pullman coaches are included in the details below, except where noted.

North Eastern Region
The North Eastern Region (NER) had camping coaches available from 1952 until 1964. An initial batch of 15 6-berth coach conversions were done at York in time for the summer of 1952. Their initial locations in 1952 and 1953 are not confirmed.

The coaches remained in much the same locations throughout, both Sandsend, Kettleness and Staithes sites closed after the 1958 season when the Loftus to Whitby (West Cliff) line closed.

These latter two vehicles were described in the literature as each being two camping coaches leading to some confusion in the numbers of coaches and they were probably available from 1956.

The coaches at Robin Hood's Bay and Scalby were the only coaches outside of the Southern Region to be provided with electricity.

Camping Cottages
The buildings remained in use until the 1960s and were closed when the camping coach services were withdrawn from those lines.

Eastern Region
The Eastern Region (ER) had camping coaches available from 1952 until 1965. An initial batch of 10 6-berth coach conversions were done at Doncaster in time for the summer of 1952.

London Midland Region
The London Midland Region (LMR) had camping coaches available from 1952 until 1971. Two initial batches each of 12 6-berth coach conversions were completed, one batch at each of Derby and Wolverton works, in time for the summer of 1952. The donor coaches were mostly former  LNWR stock of 1906 - 1920 vintage. The locations of these initial coaches is uncertain for the years 1952 and 1953.

The LMR installed Calor gas in the coaches for heating, lighting and cooking although this wasn't included in the hire cost but was available locally, usually from the stationmaster, at moderate cost.

Scottish Region
The Scottish Region (ScR) inherited sites from both the LMS and the LNER, it had up to 47 coaches available from 1952 to 1969. The coaches were converted in batches, the first batch of 10 conversions, done at St Rollox in 1952, being similar to LMR conversions made on former LNWR stock of 1906 to 1915 vintage. Most of the remaining conversions, done between 1953 and 1957 were mostly made to former Caledonian Railway  stock, there were a few conversions of shorter coaches.

Up until 1962 the ScR returned most of its coaches at the end of each season to St Rollox for refurbishment and they were then moved to three sites for storage over the winter, the former carriage shed at Aviemore, Sighthill carriage sidings in Glasgow and at Ballater. In 1963 they instituted a system of on-site inspection and maintenance in order to reduce the number of coach movements, from then on coaches were gradually removed from service as they declined.

Whilst the rental system was the same on the ScR as it was elsewhere, there was a charge for the coaches rental plus a minimum number of return tickets to the coach location, they did allow a number of weeks at the start and end of the season when railway employees could use their concessionary travel passes.

Camping Apartments

Southern Region
The Southern Region (SR) had camping coaches available from 1948 until 1967. The Southern Railway had been the only pre-nationalisation company to re-introduce them after the war, see above.

The SR converted two more coaches in 1948 and then a further batch of 10 in 1953 mainly from  former LSWR stock, giving a maximum of 36 (plus the three lost during the war years). The pre-war 6-wheel stock was withdrawn at the end of the 1953 season when it was replaced by the new batch.

Western Region

The Western Region (WR) had camping coaches available from 1952 until 1964. An initial batch of 30 8-berth coach conversions were completed by the summer of 1952.

The layout of the vehicles was with a kitchen at one end, then a partial partition to a living/dining room, both of which were full width, then a corridor leading to three bedrooms with beds laid out across the vehicle, one 4-berth and two 2-berth cabins, one of the beds in the 4-berth cabin was moveable and could be placed elsewhere.

This initial batch were individually sited in 1952 at:

Five more conversions were made in 1954, ten in 1956, five in 1957 and a final ten in 1958, making 60 in all. In 1956 the WR changed its policy on one coach per site and started to position multiple coaches at some sites.

1960 was a peak year for the WR and their coaches were deployed as follows, one coach per site unless noted:
England:  (2),  (8),  (2),  (2),  (2),  (2),  and Wells.

The WR stopped provision of camping coaches to the public after the end of the 1964 season. These coaches remained in use until 1980/81 and proved to be so successful that they were replaced with new conversions between 1981 and 1983, some of which were still being used in 1997. Seven of these later conversions were mainly 8 berth conversions of former BR Mark 1 restaurant/buffet cars but two of them were 6 berth conversions of former LMS engineers saloons.

The Western Region Staff Association also took control of the six Pullman coaches at Marazion which despite the station closing to passengers and goods, in 1964 and 1965 respectively, the line remains open. The coaches were in use into the 1970s before being sold privately in 1984.

Córas Iompair Éireann
The Córas Iompair Éireann (CIÉ) had eight "Holiday Camping Coaches" in service between 1959 and 1967.
Early in 1968 the camping coaches were withdrawn.

Locations
In 1959 the CIÉ located the first batch of six camping coaches (HC1-HC6) at three sites: Dungarvan, Killarney and Carrick-on-Shannon. Apparently the season was successful and two more coaches were converted for the 1960 season, for Tramore (HC7-HC8). The two at Carrick-on-Shannon were transferred to Galway.

Ulster Transport Authority
The Ulster Transport Authority (UTA) in Northern Ireland also had two camping coaches in operation in Ballycastle in the 1960s.

Publicity

Prior to nationalisation each of the railway companies produced their own posters, leaflets and guides, examples of which are above. After the reintroduction of camping coaches in 1952 British Railways (BR) advertised them in a variety of ways, taking advertising space in public timetables and in the annual BR "Holiday Guide" ("Holiday Haunts" from 1958). Eye catching posters were produced and displayed at stations. A national pamphlet was produced each year from the mid 1950s until 1966 by which time the service was only available on the London Midland and Scottish regions, who then made do with simple fly-sheets. A final publicity effort was made by the sole remaining provider, the London Midland Region, in 1970.

Camping coaches in the media
Camping coaches were to be found on promotional films as part of the publicity effort: 
 Camping Coach 1948 shows details of a Southern Region coach in Devon.
 Camping Coach 1953 shows details of an unlocated coach.
 The Railway Roundabout TV documentary series (1957-1963) featured some clips of camping coaches including a short article on them in 1958.

Preserved coaches
A number of camping coaches made it into preservation, two of which at the Ravenglass and Eskdale Railway are still available for hire as camping coaches (although in 2020 they were undergoing refurbishment).

Former BR camping coaches were used by several preserved railways to house their volunteers, including the Llangollen Railway, the Gloucestershire Warwickshire Railway, the South Devon Railway, the Bodmin and Wenford Railway and the Severn Valley Railway.

Modern equivalents

Coaches
The camping coach principle has stood the test of time and there are some modern equivalents, such as:

 Amsterdam, Netherlands, Train Lodge hostel.
 Beaworthy, Devon.
 , Devon.
 , Somerset.
 , near Castle Douglas, Dumfries and Galloway.
 Bures, Suffolk.
 Canterbury, Kent.
 Cape Town, South Africa.
 , North Yorkshire.
 , Shropshire.
 Dahn-Reichenbach, Germany, converted carriages.
 , Devon.
 Eardisley, Herefordshire.
 , North Yorkshire.
 Fairbanks, Alaska.
 Frickingen, Germany.
 , Highland.
 , North Yorkshire.
 , Norfolk.
 , Cornwall.
 Hayling Island, Hampshire, two coaches combined and converted.
 , Hampshire, converted carriage in a restored station.
 , North Yorkshire.
 , Argyll and Bute.
 Merzen, Germany.
 Mossel bay, Western Cape, South Africa.
 , Converted coach, TOAD Brake Van & Ammunition Wagon located in the K&ESR station, Northiam, East Sussex.
 The Patch, King's Lynn, Norfolk, a chalet with a railway carriage within it.
 , West Sussex.
 , Cumbria.
 , Highland.
 Seabank, Selsey, West Sussex, two coaches combined and converted.
 , North Yorkshire.
 , Cornwall.
 Tatamagouche train station, Nova Scotia, Canada, Train Station Inn & Railway Dining Car.
 Ullock, near Cockermouth, Cumbria.
 Undara, Queensland, Australia.
 Wiliton, Somerset.
 Wisbech St Mary, Cambridgeshire.
 Wolkenstein, Germany.

References

Notes

Citations

Bibliography

Further reading

External links

Railway coaches of the United Kingdom
Tourist accommodations in the United Kingdom
Railway services introduced in 1933